Sebastián Rozental Igualt (born 1 September 1976) is a Chilean former professional footballer who played as an attacking midfielder or striker. At club level, Rozental played for Universidad Católica (1992–1996 and 2005), Colo-Colo (2001), and Unión Española (2003–04) in his native Chile, Rangers (1997–2000) in Scotland, where he became the first player from South America to play for the club, Independiente (2001) in Argentina, Grasshoppers (2003–04) in Switzerland, and Puerto Rico Islanders in the USL First Division (2005).

Early and personal life
Rozental was born in Santiago, Chile, and is Jewish.

Club career

Rangers
Rozental became Rangers' first South American player when he signed for £4 million on 13 December 1996, the most expensive signing in Chilean history. He arrived at Rangers as a promising young talent, as he had broken into the Chile national team and was challenging Marcelo Salas and Iván Zamorano for a place in the starting eleven, following a decent scoring record at his club.  He made his debut as a substitute in a league match at Motherwell. However injury struck in his second appearance for Rangers versus St Johnstone in the Scottish Cup; he started the game well and scored his first goal for the club, but was then taken off with a knee injury. He made three appearances in 1997–98 and another three in 1998–99. He had his first significant run in the team in the second half of the 1999–2000 season, helping Rangers complete a league and cup double. He made 11 appearances and scored 3 goals in the league that season, and scored twice in their cup semi final win over Ayr United. He was however left out of the squad for the final. He made 21 appearances for Rangers, scoring 6 goals.

Late career
Rozental signed for the Columbus Crew on 13 January 2006. His first goal as a Crew member came on a penalty kick on 15 April against the Chicago Fire. He played 20 games and scored 3 goals total during the 2006 season.

After spending one season with the Columbus Crew, Rozental got the Israeli citizenship and left for Israel and signed with Maccabi Petah Tikva. After failing to impress in one half season in Petah Tikva, Rozental signed a one-year contract with Maccabi Netanya.

International career
Rozental has been capped for Chile 27 times scoring 2 goals. In addition, he played for Chile B against England B on February 10, 1998. Chile won by 2-1.

He captained the Chilean squad that finished third in the 1993 FIFA U-17 World Championship and then scored 3 goals at the 1995 FIFA World Youth Championship. Also, he took part of Chile U23 squad in the 1996 Pre-Olynpic Tournament.

Honours
Universidad Católica
 Copa Interamericana: 1993
 Copa Chile: 1995
 Liga Chilena de Fútbol: Primera División: 2002 (C)

Rangers
  Scottish Premier League: 1999–2000

Grasshoppers
 Swiss Super League: 2002–03

Chile U17
 FIFA U-17 World Cup third place: 1993

Individual
 Chilean Footballer of the Year: 1996

See also
List of select Jewish football (association; soccer) players

References

1976 births
Living people
Chilean Jews
Footballers from Santiago
Association football midfielders
Association football forwards
Jewish footballers
Chilean footballers
Chilean expatriate footballers
Chile international footballers
Chile under-20 international footballers
Chile youth international footballers
Club Deportivo Universidad Católica footballers
Rangers F.C. players
Club Atlético Independiente footballers
Colo-Colo footballers
Grasshopper Club Zürich players
Unión Española footballers
Puerto Rico Islanders players
Columbus Crew players
Maccabi Petah Tikva F.C. players
Maccabi Netanya F.C. players
Chilean Primera División players
Scottish Football League players
Scottish Premier League players
Argentine Primera División players
Swiss Super League players
USL First Division players
Major League Soccer players
Israeli Premier League players
Expatriate footballers in Scotland
Expatriate footballers in Argentina
Expatriate footballers in Switzerland
Expatriate footballers in Puerto Rico
Expatriate soccer players in the United States
Expatriate footballers in Israel
Chilean expatriate sportspeople in Scotland
Chilean expatriate sportspeople in the United Kingdom
Chilean expatriate sportspeople in Argentina
Chilean expatriate sportspeople in Switzerland
Chilean expatriate sportspeople in Puerto Rico
Chilean expatriate sportspeople in the United States
Chilean expatriate sportspeople in Israel
Chilean emigrants to Israel
Naturalized citizens of Israel
Israeli people of Chilean descent
Jewish Chilean sportspeople
People from Santiago